Jens Gusek (born 8 July 1965) is a German former fencer. He competed in the team foil event for East Germany at the 1988 Summer Olympics.

References

External links
 

1965 births
Living people
German male fencers
Olympic fencers of East Germany
Fencers at the 1988 Summer Olympics
People from Weißwasser
Sportspeople from Saxony